English-New Zealand singer Daniel Bedingfield has released two studio albums, twelve singles and two EPs.

Studio albums

EPs

Singles

As lead artist

As featured artist

Compilation appearances

Other songs
 "Heaven" – Daniel Bedingfield and DJ Izzy B (2000)
 "You Got Me Singing" – Daniel Bedingfield and DJ Izzy B (2000)
 "Ain't Nobody" (live at the Brits) – Natasha Bedingfield with Daniel Bedingfield (2005)
 "Everyday" – Coolooloosh featuring Daniel Bedingfield (2011)
 "Just a Party" – Daniel Bedingfield featuring Busy Signal (2012)
 "Call to Me" – Sharam featuring Daniel Bedingfield (2016)
 "Bubblin'" - Original Dodger (2018)

Songwriting credits
 "Back in My Life" – 2 Man Gang (2002)
 "E Z When You Want 2" – 2 Man Gang (2002)
 "Hold Me in Your Arms" – H & Claire (2002)
 "Works for Me" – David Archuleta (2008)
 "Can't Make This Over" – Pixie Lott (2009)
 "Miss You" – Pixie Lott (unreleased)
 "Get Down" – David Joseph (2011)
 "Phantom Wifey" – Rowdy Superstar (2012)
 "WAR" – Rowdy Superstar (2012)
 "When the Rain Is Gone" – Adam F (2012)
 "In Love vs. Lovin'" – Lynfield (2013)
 "Get Down" – Concept (2014)
 "I Wanna Feel" – Secondcity (2014)
 "I Did It" – Spica (2014)
 "Testify" – Ben Haenow (2015)
 "Wild Emotion" – Asta (2016)
 "Freak Like Me" – Lee Walker vs DJ Deeon featuring Katy B and MNEK (2016)
 "Work from Home" – Fifth Harmony (2016)
 "Make You Believe in Love" – Marcus & Martinus (2017)
 "Original" – Matt Terry (2017)
 "Livin' In'" - Super Junior-D&E (2018)
 "Stardust" with Cara Onofrio, Emelie Eriksson, Johan Röhr, Alex Aiono, Billy Mann
 "Hero" - Weezer (2020)

Unreleased songs
 "A Thousand Life Times" (featuring Mariah Carey)
 "Can't Make This Over"
 "Candy (Apple of Your Eye)"
 "Closure"
 "Domestic Silence"
 "Dynamite"
 "Fire Eyes"
 "First Base"
 "Heads or Tails"
 "Holding On"
 "I Love You But I Need You to Leave Me" (Demo)
 "I'll Be Home"
 "I've Been Waiting" (Demo)
 "I Will Find You"
 "Imagine If It Was You"
 "More" (Daniel Bedingfield/Thomas Ely/Dean Livermore)
 "Only Thing I'll Ever Know (Eric Appapoulay/Daniel Bedingfield/Andrew Kostek)
 "Out of My Head" (written with Adam Fenton and featured in the film The Curse of Downers Grove)
 "Remember"
 "Saving Yourself for You" (Daniel Bedingfield/Thomas Ely/Dean Livermore)
 "Still Wanna Mess Around"
 "Stop Wastin' Your Time" (Daniel Bedingfield/Thomas Ely/Dean Livermore)
 "Take Me Away" (with Tim Myers)
 "Tell Me"
 "The Things I Say to You"
 "Things We Do for Love"
 "Too Hot"
 "YOY"
”I believe” (co written with Andy Kostek)

References

Discographies of British artists
Discographies of New Zealand artists
Pop music discographies